Ayrat Naziorovich Karimov (4 May 1971 – 24 February 2020) was a Russian professional footballer.

Club career
Karimov made his professional debut in the Soviet First League in 1987 for FC Rostselmash Rostov-on-Don. He played 1 game in the UEFA Intertoto Cup 1996 for FC Rotor Volgograd.

Death
Karimov died on 24 February 2020 at the age of 48.

References

1971 births
2020 deaths
People from Kamensk-Shakhtinsky
Soviet footballers
Russian footballers
Association football goalkeepers
FC Rostov players
FC SKA Rostov-on-Don players
FC Taganrog players
FC Rotor Volgograd players
PFC Spartak Nalchik players
FC Zhenis Astana players
FC Shakhter Karagandy players
Russian Premier League players
Kazakhstan Premier League players
Russian expatriate footballers
Expatriate footballers in Kazakhstan
Russian expatriate sportspeople in Kazakhstan
FC Petrotrest players
Sportspeople from Rostov Oblast